The academic dress of University of Melbourne describes the formal attire of robes, gowns and hoods prescribed by the Statutes and Regulations for undergraduates, graduates, officers and honorands of the university. This follows
the Oxford style for the
gowns and hoods
for the Bachelors and Masters degrees.
For its doctorates,
Melbourne follows the style of Cambridge.

The hoods are all black
(of size and shape those of the Oxford MA; i.e. Burgon simple-shape)
lined with the colour specified for the relevant faculty or degree,
and bound with white (on the lower edge) for bachelors,
and no binding for masters.  The faculty or degree colours are specified in the University Regulations.
Formerly, Pass degrees were bound in
fur and Honours
in silk
— however the distinction no longer exists.
Bachelors wear an Oxford Bachelors gown,
and Masters an Oxford Masters gown.
The undergraduate gown is the same as the bachelors,
but the sleeves must not be split.
Masters
may wear the mortar board, however undergraduate students and Bachelors are not permitted to wear the mortar board.  This rule is strictly applied and extends to graduation photography as well as the ceremony itself.

The academic dress for a PhD consists of an Oxford masters gown,
faced in scarlet, with a black hood lined in scarlet,
and a bonnet with a scarlet cord.
Higher doctorates are scarlet,
lined and faced in the
colour of the faculty/degree,
with a larger scarlet hood lined in the colour
of the faculty/degree, and a bonnet with a gold cord.

Occasions for academic dress

Dignitaries, officers, staff, graduates and students wear academic dress at public ceremonies of the University of Melbourne.
These include graduation ceremonies and important public lectures.

Dignitaries, visitors and residents of the residential colleges wear their academic regalia to a formal dinner several nights per week during the lecturing semester
(varying depending on the college). Some residential colleges dignify their fellows with distinct gowns.

Faculty colours 

Definition of colour names:

Colours

Notes

References
 Regalia (Academic Dress) requirements for University of Melbourne degree courses

Melbourne
University of Melbourne
Academia in Australia